Happy Times (Spanish: Tiempos felices) is a 2014 Mexican comedy film directed by Luis Javier Henaine. The film premiered first on 21 October 2014 at the Morelia International Film Festival. And subsequently it was distributed by Cinépolis in 31 cities of Mexico on 20 February 2015. It stars Luis Arrieta, and Cassandra Ciangherotti.

Plot 
Max (Luis Arrieta) is a nerd and designer who has Mónica (Cassandra Ciangherotti) as a girlfriend, nothing spectacular; In fact, so annoying that the protagonist is fed up with her but does not know how to end the relationship because when he tries, he always ends up in bed with her. For this reason, Max decides to hire the services of "Abaddon", an agency specialized in ending courtships with unorthodox techniques; however, they make everything more complicated than it seems.

Cast 
 Luis Arrieta as Max Quintana
 Cassandra Ciangherotti as Mónica Villalobos
 Bárbara de Regil as Andrea Villalobos
 Jorge Caballero as Agency Researcher
 Fernando Becerril as Señor Villalobos
 Roger Cudney as Dr. Guillermo Murray
 Fernando Gaviria as Mamado
 Iván Arana as Rigo
 Veronica Falcón as Tía de Mónica

References

External links 
 
2014 comedy films
Mexican comedy films
2010s Spanish-language films